Martín Jaite (born 9 October 1964) is a former top-10 professional tennis player from Argentina.

Jaite's career-high Association of Tennis Professionals singles ranking was world no. 10, which he achieved in the summer of 1990, and he won a total of 12 titles and $1,873,881 in tour prize money during his career.

Jaite's playing style leveraged his consistency, speed, thoughtful use of tactics, and fitness to compensate for his lack of power.

Early life
Jaite was born in Buenos Aires, Argentina, and is Jewish.

Tennis career
Jaite was a top junior in both Spain and Argentina. He joined Argentina's Davis Cup team. He began playing on the ATP tour in 1983, and soon was ranked among the top 20 players in the world. He reached the quarterfinals in competition at the French Open in 1985, defeating Paolo Canè, Trevor Allan, Miloslav Mečíř and Heinz Günthardt before losing to Ivan Lendl. In May 1986 at Forest Hills Jaite defeated world no. 4 Boris Becker 6–2, 7–6.

In May 1987, Jaite beat world no. 9 Henri Leconte in Germany in two tiebreaks. In September 1987, Jaite upset world no. 3 Mats Wilander in five sets to win a competition in Barcelona, Spain. In April 1989, he upset world no. 8 Jakob Hlasek in two sets in Monte Carlo.

Jaite became only the sixth South American to be ranked in the top 10 in the ATP computer rankings, reaching no. 10 in 1990. In May 1990, he defeated world no. 2 Stefan Edberg 3–6, 6–2, 6–4 in Germany. Jaite defeated world no. 4 Guy Forget 6–2, 6–2 in April 1991 in France, and then again in July, 7–6(5), 7–5, in Gstaad, Switzerland.

Olympics
He participated for his native country at the 1988 Summer Olympics in Seoul, but lost to Brad Gilbert, the eventual winner of the bronze medal.

Davis Cup
Jaite was 14–20 in Davis Cup play, 11–7 in singles on clay, from 1984 to 1999.

Jaite was involved in a Davis Cup tie against the US in Buenos Aires when Andre Agassi was leading 6–2, 6–2, 5–0. Jaite was leading 40–0 in the sixth game of the third set, and missed his first serve. Agassi then called out to his then-coach Nick Bollettieri, "hey watch this", and then followed by catching the second serve in his left hand to give Jaite the game. Viewed as an act of disrespect, Agassi was booed by the crowd for five minutes.

After tennis
Jaite has had an important role in Argentine tennis since his retirement. He is the tournament director for ATP Buenos Aires, the Buenos Aires Challenger, and director of Futures events in Argentina. From July 2007 till December 2008, Jaite was coaching David Nalbandian, and helped lead him to titles in Madrid and Bercy, where he became the first man to defeat the top two players in the world, Roger Federer and Rafael Nadal, in consecutive tournaments.  In 2011, Jaite was named captain of the Argentina Davis Cup team.

Career finals

Singles: 19 (12 wins – 7 losses)

Doubles: 2 (1 win – 1 loss)

See also
List of Jewish tennis players

References

External links
 
 
 
 

1964 births
Living people
Argentine Jews
Argentine male tennis players
Jewish Argentine sportspeople
Jewish tennis players
Olympic tennis players of Argentina
Tennis players from Buenos Aires
Tennis players at the 1988 Summer Olympics